Anthony Lawrence (born 1957) is a contemporary Australian poet and novelist. Lawrence has received a number of Australia Council for the Arts Literature Board Grants, including a Fellowship, and has won many awards for his poetry, including the inaugural Judith Wright Calanthe Award, the Gwen Harwood Memorial Prize, and the Newcastle Poetry Prize (three times). His most recent collection is Headwaters (Pitt Street Poetry) which was awarded the Prime Minister's Literary Award for Poetry in 2017.

Published works
Poetry
101 Poems,  Pitt Street Poetry, 2018
Headwaters, Pitt Street Poetry, 2016
 Signal Flare, Puncher & Wattman,, 2013
 The Welfare of My Enemy, Puncher & Wattman.
 Bark, University of Queensland Press, 2008.
 Words & Music, Picaro Press, 2008.
 Magnetic Field, Picaro Press, 2008.
 Strategies for Confronting Fear : New and Selected Poems Lancashire, England : Arc Publications, 2006.
 The Sleep of a Learning Man  Giramondo Publishing, 2003.
 Skinned by Light : Poems 1989 – 2002   University of Queensland Press, 2002.
 New and Selected Poems  University of Queensland Press, 1998.
 The Viewfinder  University of Queensland Press, 1996.
 Cold Wires of Rain  Penguin Books, 1995.
 The Darkwood Aquarium Penguin Books, 1993.
 Three Days Out of Tidal Town Hale and Iremonger, 1992.
  Dreaming in Stone  Angus and Robertson, 1989.Fiction
 In the Half-Light Picador, Australia and UK, and Carroll & Graff, USA, 2000.

Awards
 Peter Porter Poetry Prize, 2022: winner for 'In the Shadows of Our Heads'
 Australian Prime Ministers Literary Award for Poetry 2017
Newcastle Poetry Prize 2015.
 The Philip Hodgins Medal.  Awarded at the 2015 Mildura Writers Festival
 Newcastle Poetry Prize 2014.  (jointly with Debi Hamilton)
 6th Blake Poetry Prize 2013: winner for 'Appellations' 
 Peter Porter Poetry Prize, 2010: winner for 'Domestic Emergencies'
 The Age Book of the Year Award, Dinny O'Hearn Poetry Prize, 2008: shortlisted for Bark Queensland Premier's Literary Awards, Arts Queensland, Judith Wright Calanthe Prize for Poetry, 2008: shortlisted for Bark Peter Porter Poetry Prize, 2007: shortlisted for 'Guidance and Knowledge' (Note: Prize known as the ABR Poetry Prize in 2007.)
 Tasmania Book Prizes, Tasmania Book Prize, 2005: shortlisted for The Sleep of a Learning Man The Age Book of the Year Award, poetry, 2004: shortlisted for The Sleep of a Learning Man Victorian Premier's Literary Awards, The C. J. Dennis Prize for Poetry, 2004: shortlisted for The Sleep of a Learning Man Colin Roderick Award, 2002: shortlisted for Skinned by Light : Poems 1989 – 2002 Josephine Ulrick National Poetry Prize, 2001: winner for 'The Rain'
 Inaugural Judith Wright Calanthe Award, 1999: winner for New and Selected Poems NSW Premier's Literary Awards, Kenneth Slessor Prize for Poetry, 1997: winner for The Viewfinder''
 Grace Perry Memorial Award, 1988: runner-up for 'Blood Oath'

External links
 Austlit entry page
 Poetry Archive UK page
 Interview with Ralph Wessman in Famous Reporter
 Interview with Robbie Coburn in Rochford Street Review

References

1957 births
Australian poets
Living people